Melanothamnus harveyi  (Polysiphonia harveyi), Harvey's siphon weed, is a small marine red alga in the division of Rhodophyta.

Description
The erect branches are formed by a central axis surrounded by four perecentral cells of the same length. A cortex may develop by cells growing downwards in the grooves between the perecentrals. Latteral branches are usually dense. The holdfast is a disk of downgrowing filaments from which further erect branches develop. The general appearance is very variable.

Reproduction
This species is dioecious, meaning that individuals either have male or female reproductive systems. Spermatangial axes develop on trichoblasts. The cystocarps are globular borne on wide stalks. Tetrasporangia occur in series near the tips of the branches.

Habitat
Melanothamnus harveyi grows epiphytically on other algae as well as on artificial material.

Distribution
This species can be found in England, Scotland, Ireland, Norway, France, Denmark and the east coast of North America.

References

Rhodomelaceae